A slugburger (originally Weeksburger) is a traditional Southern food found in the area of Northeast Mississippi, particularly Corinth, New Albany, Booneville, Iuka, Tishomingo, Burnsville, West Tennessee, and north Alabama, particularly Decatur, Hartselle, Athens, Moulton, and Cullman. Consisting of a patty made from a mixture of beef or pork and an inexpensive meat extender such as soybeans, it is deep fried in oil. It is typically served on a bun with mustard, pickles, onion, and in some places with a side of French fries or onion rings.

History
John Weeks brought his hamburger recipe from Chicago to Corinth in 1917. Weeks had local butchers grind his hamburger meat to specification, asking them to include potato flakes and flour. These small hamburgers were originally called Weeksburgers. Sometime before 1950, soy grits replaced the potato and flour and has remained the primary extender. According to town legend the term "slugburger" comes from the slang term for a metal disk the size of a nickel that would work in vending machines.

At one time, five of the Weeks brothers were selling Weeksburgers in the south end of Corinth.  As well as running twelve other hamburger stands, one of the brothers ran stands out of old trolley cars after the Second World War, including one in Booneville.

Slugburger Festival

Each year the citizens of Corinth as well as those who travel from miles around descend on the town to pay tribute to this local culinary specialty at the annual Slugburger Festival.
The festival is held in downtown Corinth for three weekend evenings during July and run by Main Street Corinth.  There is entertainment at Train Depot and a carnival by Trailhead Park plus the World Slugburger Eating Championship.

TripAdvisor.com considers the festival one of the “wackiest” Summer events along with The Great Texas Mosquito Festival, Michigan's Humongous Fungus festival and the Hollerin’ Contest.  As a part of the entertainment, the festival holds a singing contest, Slug Idol, featuring contestants from surrounding counties in Tennessee and Mississippi.
 
The Slugburger Festival was started in 1988. In 2012, the first World Slugburger Eating Championship was held at the Festival, and the winners have come exclusively from Northern California, as professional Major League Eating eaters have dominated.  Matt Stonie from San Jose, California won the first three, the last of which in 2014 he set the world record with 43 slugburgers eaten in 10 minutes, beating out Joey Chestnut in the field of 11.  In 2015, Chestnut made amends just days after the eight-time Nathan's Hot Dog Eating Contest was defeated there by Stonie, who did not compete in Mississippi, by taking Stonie's crown in slugburgers with 33 eaten.  He repeated the feat with 41 in 2016, after he had reclaimed the Nathan's title days earlier.

See also

 List of hamburgers
 Slider sandwich

References

External links
Weeks' Diner
History of the Slugburger
Slugburger Festival Homepage

Cuisine of the Southern United States
Hamburgers (food)